5vor12 is a biannual German magazine distributed free to schools. In addition to advertisements for companies and institutions to present their vacancies, advice on application and interviews are included. The medium is supported by educational institutions in Germany. The idea for the concept came in 1993. Then it was first published the same year. There are now twelve regional editions nationwide in Germany, each of which appear in metropolitan areas in schools.

See also
 List of magazines in Germany

References

Biannual magazines published in Germany
Education in Germany
Education magazines
Free magazines
German-language magazines
Magazines established in 1993
1993 establishments in Germany